Halcyon Days is the second studio album by BWO. It was released on 19 April 2006. It peaked at number 1 on the Swedish Albums Chart.

Track listing

Charts

Weekly charts

Year-end charts

Halcyon Nights 

Halcyon Nights is a remix album containing remixed versions of the songs released on Halcyon Days.

The album was released on December 27, 2006.

Track listing
 Chariots of Fire (Radio Edit) - 4:08
 Sixteen Tons of Hardware (Poker Pets 12" Mix) - 7:12
 Temple of Love (SoundFactory Reconstruction Anthem Radio Remix) - 3:59
 Open Door (Paradise Garage Mix) - 4:43
 Obsession (Johan S Remix) - 3:09
 Sunshine in the Rain (Sound Factory New York Anthem Edit) - 4:58
 Sixteen Tons of Hardware (Brasco Club Mix Edit) - 7:20
 Temple of Love (Carl Ryden Remix) - 7:07
 Voodoo Magic (SoundFactory Big Room Anthem Edit) - 5:16
 Open Door (DJ Slow Mix) - 4:05
 Chariots of Fire (Remix Radio Edit) - 3:40
 We Could Be Heroes (SoundFactory Futuretro Mix) - 5:27
 Living in a Fantasy (Johan S Remix) - 3:32
 Sunshine in the Rain (Johan Afterglow Electro Mix) - 3:51
 Sixteen Tons of Hardware (SoundFactory Supersonic Anthem Edit) - 5:10
 Open Door (Brasco Remake) - 3:45

References

External links
 

2006 albums
BWO (band) albums